Veck may refer to:
Vecuronium bromide
Recea-Cristur, a commune in Romania
 Toby "Trotty" Veck and Margaret "Meg" Veck, characters in Dicken's novel The Chimes